Watchara Sukchum (also known as Jennie Panhan, born 30 October 1986) is a Thai actress and host. She is known for being a host of several GMMTV shows such as Toey Tiew Thai: The Route, Hungry Sister and Jen Jud God Jig. As an actress, she is known for her support roles in Room Alone 401-410 (2014), 3 Will Be Free (2019) and The Shipper (2020).

Early life and education 
Watchara was born in Songkhla Province, Thailand to Police Lieutenant Colonel Satcha Sukchum and Manchusuk Sukchum. While she originally wanted to take up communication arts, she went on to graduate with a bachelor's degree in French from the Faculty of Archeology at Silpakorn University.

Growing up as a trans woman with a policeman father, Watchara admitted that her father has never beaten her unlike how sexual deviant individuals of policemen or soldiers are usually portrayed in television. As the eldest sibling, she is closer to her sister, with whom she has a one-year age gap, than her younger brother who is six years younger than her. She got her nickname "Jennie" from the 1996 Thai movie Jenny and later the "Panhan" while working for Channel V Thailand, which she said sounded like a beautiful southern girl.

Career 
She started in the entertainment industry through Trasher Bangkok, a Bangkok-based theme party organizer, where she was part of their parody videos. One of which was her parody on Katy Perry's The One That Got Away music video which caught Perry's attention. As her parody videos went viral, this opened several opportunities for her among which was being an assistant producer for Channel V Thailand and later on, as part of GMM Grammy's Bang channel.

In 2016, she became one of the main hosts of GMMTV's Toey Tiew Thai: The Route along with Kittipat Chalaruk (Golf), Tatchakorn Boonlapayanan (Godji) and Niti Chaichitathorn (Pompam), who later switched from being the show's main host to its special host. She also had acting roles in several television series such as Love at First Hate (2018), 3 Will Be Free (2019) and The Shipper (2020).

Filmography

Film

Television

Master of Ceremony: MC

Awards and nominations

References

External links 
 
 
 

1986 births
Living people
Jennie Panhan
Jennie Panhan
Jennie Panhan
Jennie Panhan
Jennie Panhan
LGBT Buddhists
Jennie Panhan
Jennie Panhan
Jennie Panhan
Jennie Panhan
Jennie Panhan
Jennie Panhan
Jennie Panhan